Harry Ford may refer to:

 Harry Ford (actor) (born 1987), American actor
 Harry Ford (Australian footballer) (1884–1957), Australian rules footballer
 Harry Ford (baseball) (born 2003), American baseball player
 Harry Ford (footballer, born 1893) (1893–1963), English footballer

See also
 Henry Ford (disambiguation)